Grand Street was a train station along the Evergreen Branch of the Long Island Rail Road. The station was built on May 15, 1878 by the South Side Railroad of Long Island between Metropolitan Avenue and Grand Street (Brooklyn) at the East River Ferry. From the Greenpoint Terminal it took 10 minutes to get here. Grand Street was closed on September 28, 1885.

References

External links
EVERGREEN BRANCH: another lost LIRR line (Forgotten New York)
Bushwick Branch Approximation
Arrts Archives THE   L.I.R.R.'S  EVERGREEN BRANCH

Former Long Island Rail Road stations in New York City
Railway stations closed in 1885
Railway stations in the United States opened in 1878
Railway stations in Brooklyn
Grand Street and Grand Avenue